William McClung (July 12, 1758 – 1811) was a United States circuit judge of the United States Circuit Court for the Sixth Circuit.

Education and career

Born on July 12, 1758, in Rockbridge County, Colony of Virginia, British America, McClung graduated from Liberty Hall Academy (now Washington and Lee University) in 1785 and read law. He entered private practice in Bardstown, District of Kentucky, Virginia (State of Kentucky from June 1, 1792) from 1791 to 1796. He was a member of the Kentucky House of Representatives in 1793. He was a member of the Kentucky Senate from 1796 to 1800.

Federal judicial service

He was confirmed by the United States Senate on February 24, 1801, and received his commission the same day. His service terminated on July 1, 1802, due to abolition of the court.

Later career and death

Following his departure from the federal bench, McClung was a Judge of the Kentucky Circuit Court in Nelson County until 1811. He died in 1811 in Mason County, Kentucky.

References

Sources
 
The McClung genealogy - By William McClung

1758 births
1811 deaths
19th-century American judges
Judges of the United States circuit courts
United States federal judges appointed by John Adams
Washington and Lee University alumni
United States federal judges admitted to the practice of law by reading law
18th-century American judges